Edsel is an unincorporated community within Elliott County, Kentucky, United States. Its post office is closed.

A post office was established in the community in 1929 and it was named Edsel for the postmaster's nephew.

References

Unincorporated communities in Elliott County, Kentucky
Unincorporated communities in Kentucky